Huthart is a surname. Notable people with the surname include:

Eunice Huthart (born 1966), English stunt performer
Victor Huthart (1924–1997), British sport shooter

See also
Hughart